The Jester is a 1988 Soviet drama film directed by Andrei Andreyevich Eshpai.

Plot 
The film tells about a smart boy who takes revenge on others for his grievances, but cannot resist the beautiful classmate Ira.

Cast 
 Dmitri Vesensky
 Marina Mayevskaya
 Igor Kostolevskiy
 Genrietta Yegorova
 Yelena Yevseyenko
 Anatoliy Grachyov
 Aleksandr Zabolotsky	
 Vasiliy Michkov
 Andrei Semyonov
 Gelena Kirik

References

External links 

1988 films
1980s Russian-language films
Soviet drama films
1988 drama films
Soviet teen films